Richard Alan Fortey  (born 15 February 1946 in London) is a British palaeontologist, natural historian, writer and television presenter, who served as president of the Geological Society of London for its bicentennial year of 2007.

Early life and education
Fortey was educated at Ealing Grammar School for Boys and King's College, Cambridge, where he read Natural Sciences specialising in geology. He received a PhD and DSc from the University of Cambridge.

Career
Fortey has had a long career as a palaeontologist at the Natural History Museum in London; his research interests include above all, trilobites: at the age of 14, he discovered his first trilobite, sparking a passionate interest that later became a career. He has named numerous trilobite species and still continues his research despite having retired from the Museum.

He studies trilobites and graptolites, especially those from the Ordovician and their systematics, evolution and modes of life; he is also involved in research on Ordovician palaeogeography and correlation; arthropod evolution, especially the origin of major groups and the relationships between divergence times, as revealed by molecular evidence and the fossil record. His scientific output includes over 250 papers on trilobites, Ordovician stratigraphy and palaeogeography.

He is the author of popular science books on a range of subjects including geology, palaeontology, evolution and natural history.
Since 2012, he has also been a television presenter appearing on BBC Four presenting natural history programmes; was Collier Professor for the Public Understanding of Science and Technology at the Institute of Advanced Studies in the University of Bristol 2002 and Visiting Professor of Palaeobiology at the University of Oxford 1999–2009.

Television
Fortey has appeared in several of David Attenborough's programmes, including the second episode of David Attenborough's Lost Worlds, Vanished Lives in 1989, as well as First Life in 2010, travelling with the presenter to the Atlas mountains to find and film trilobite fossils. He contributed to the speculative Discovery Channel documentary series The Future Is Wild.

In 2012, Fortey presented the BBC Four series Survivors: Nature's Indestructible Creatures, which took a global look at modern-day species whose ancestors survived mass extinction events in the Earth's history, while in 2013 he presented the BBC Four programme The Secret Life of Rock Pools, which aired on 16 April 2013.

In 2014, Fortey presented the BBC Four three part series Fossil Wonderlands: Nature's Hidden Treasures, followed by The Magic of Mushrooms, in which he showed that fungi had close but still poorly understood inter-relationships with plants and animals including man.
In 2016, he presented the BBC Four programme Nature’s Wonderlands: Islands of Evolution, a three part series on evolution on islands.

He appeared on BBC Two's "University Challenge – The Professionals" in 2004, as a member of the Palaeontological Association team, who beat the Eden Project.

Honours
Fortey was appointed Officer of the Order of the British Empire (OBE) in the 2023 New Year Honours for services to palaeontology and geology.

Books
 A Curious Boy, William Collins (2021, ISBN 978-0-00-832396-7)
 Fossils: The Key to the Past, Natural History Museum (1982, fifth edition 2015)
The Hidden Landscape, Jonathan Cape (1993), Bodley Head (revised edition 2010) 
 Life: An Unauthorised Biography. A Natural History of the First Four Billion Years of Life on Earth, HarperCollins (1997) Folio Society edition (2008)
 Trilobite!: Eyewitness to Evolution, HarperCollins (2000)
 The Earth: An Intimate History, HarperCollins (2004) Folio Society edition (2011)
 Dry Store Room no.1, HarperCollins (2008) 
 Survivors : The animals and Plants that Time has Left Behind, HarperCollins (2011), published as Horseshoe Crabs and Velvet Worms (2012) in the US.
 The Wood for the Trees: The Long View of Nature from a Small Wood, William Collins (2016)

He has also penned humorous titles under two pseudonyms.

 The Roderick Masters Book of Money Making Schemes, or How to Become Enormously Wealthy with Virtually no Effort, published anonymously Rutledge & Kegan Paul Ltd (1981)
 Bindweed's Bestseller Ed. Heather & David Godwin, Jackie & Richard Fortey, Pan Books (1982)

Awards and honours
For his academic research he has won the Lyell Medal of the Geological Society of London, the Linnean Medal for Zoology of the Linnean Society of London, the Frink Medal of the Zoological Society of London, the R. C. Moore Medal of the SEPM, the T. N. George Medal of the Geological Society of Glasgow; in 1997 he was elected as a fellow of the Royal Society.

His popular science writing has earned him the Natural World Book of the Year award (1994) for The Hidden Landscape; the Lewis Thomas Prize for science writing (2003) and is the 2006 holder of the Royal Society's Michael Faraday Prize for the public communication of science. In 1998, Life: An Unauthorised Biography was shortlisted for the Rhône-Poulenc Prize, in 2001, Trilobite!: Eyewitness to Evolution was shortlisted the Samuel Johnson Prize, the UK's most prestigious non-fiction award and in 2005 Earth: An Intimate History was shortlisted for the Royal Society's Aventis prize for science books. Life: an Unauthorised Biography was listed as one of ten Books of the Year by The New York Times.
He has also turned his pen to writing dinosaur poems for children and even a spoof book on the Rubik's Cube.

Fortey was elected president of the Geological Society of London for its bicentennial year of 2007 and was recently awarded honorary degrees by the University of St Andrews; the Open University; the Birmingham University and Leicester University. He has also been president of the Palaeontological Association and Palaeontographical Society; in 2009 was elected a Fellow of the Royal Society of Literature.
Fortey has also served on the councils of the Systematics Association; the Royal Society; the Palaeontographical Society (ex president); the British Mycological Society (vice president), and on the Stratigraphy Committee of the Geological Society of London; has served on the editorial boards of the Terra Nova; the Palaeontographica Italiana; the Historical Biology; the  Biological Proceedings of the Royal Society of London and the Biology Letters.

References

External links

Review by Tim Radford of the book Earth: An Intimate History, by Richard Fortey, The Guardian

1946 births
Living people
British palaeontologists
Fellows of the Royal Society
Fellows of the Geological Society of London
Fellows of the Royal Society of Literature
Employees of the Natural History Museum, London
People educated at Ealing County Grammar School for Boys
Lyell Medal winners
Alumni of King's College, Cambridge
Officers of the Order of the British Empire